Gluckman is a surname. Notable people with the surname include:

 Max Gluckman (1911–1975), South African and British social anthropologist
 Mary Gluckman (1917–1990), Italian linguist and anthropologist
 Peter Gluckman (born 1949), New Zealand Chief Science Advisor to the Prime Minister
 David Gluckman, South African Chess player
 Richard Gluckman of Gluckman Mayner Architects